Dwell time may refer to:
 Dwell time (filtration), the time a fluid remains in contact with an active filter medium. 
 Dwell time (GNSS)
 Dwell time (information retrieval), the time a user remains at a search result after a click
 Dwell time (military), the time personnel spend in home station between deployments
 Dwell time (radar), the time that an antenna beam spends on a target
 Dwell time (transportation), the time a vehicle spends at a scheduled stop without moving
 Service time, in queueing theory